João Vicente Fontella Goulart (born 22 November 1956), also known as João Goulart Filho, is a Brazilian philosopher and politician.

Biography
Son (hence Filho) of former president of the Brazilian Republic João Goulart and Dona Maria Thereza, he lived his childhood and adolescence in exile in Uruguay with his parents. He was one of the founders of the Democratic Labor Party, alongside his uncle Leonel Brizola.

He is the founder and current president of Instituto João Goulart (João Goulart Institute), which aims to promote historical research and reflection on the Brazilian political process in favor of national sovereignty.

During his lifetime, he served as a deputy at the Legislative Assembly of Rio Grande do Sul in 1982, elected by PDT. He returned to PDT, where he remained until early 2017, when he left in opposition to party support for the Rodrigo Rollemberg (PSB) government in the Federal District after the governor barred construction of the Memorial da Liberdade e Democracia Presidente João Goulart (President João Goulart Freedom and Democracy Memorial).

Lawsuit against the United States

During the promotion of his book on Brazilian territory in November 2002, Lincoln Gordon, former U.S. ambassador to Brazil in 1964, admitted that the CIA had bought Brazilian congressmen for five million dollars for the coup against João Goulart, in addition to the logistical and military support. This led the Goulart family to raise a lawsuit for moral, property and image damages against the United States, with the desire to eventually take the case to the World Court.

The 3rd Panel of the Superior Court of Justice, under the report of 's minister, would have to decide whether the act was an act of empire ("anyone who contains an order or a co-active decision of the administration for the administered, such as an expropriation decree, an interdiction order or a requisition of assets") or an act of management ("act of management are those that the administration practices without using its supremacy over the recipients. This occurs in acts purely of administration of public goods and services and in negotiations with private parties, which do not require coercion over the interested parties"). This action was an appeal after the federal judge of the 10th Circuit Court of Rio de Janeiro extinguished the case, under the interpretation that it was an act of empire. 

The Federal Regional Court of the 2nd Region considered that the competence to handle the case lies with the STJ.  considered that the United States has committed an act of management, thus, welcoming the appeal. However, there was no consensus among the ministers of the 3rd Class.

In March 2008, Minister  of the Supreme Court of Justice postponed the analysis of the action. The trial was returned on 24 June 2008. The STJ finally dismissed the case, considering that the United States has immunity under Brazilian law and the STF finally denied the request in 2010, recognizing that the United States has immunity against Brazilian law.

Presidential Campaign 2018

He was launched by the Free Fatherland Party (PPL) as a candidate for the presidency of Brazil for the 2018 elections, with Léo da Silva Alves as his running mate. His campaign aimed to resume the  that, according to him, "were being developed and the process was interrupted with the military coup of 1964".
In the election, he received 30,176 votes (0.03% of the votes), ranking last and not qualifying for the second round.

In December 2018, since it did not reach that year's election threshold, Goulart Filho's PPL joined the Communist Party of Brazil (PCdoB).

2022 elections

Pre-candidacy for the Federal District
On December 18, 2021, the Communist Party of Brazil launched João Vicente as a pre-candidate for the Federal District Government and Ana Prestes as a pre-candidate for the Senate. However, on July 16, 2022, it was announced that his pre-candidacy was withdrawn in favor of the party's support for pre-candidate Leandro Grass (PV).

Published works

 A finalist of the Prêmio Jabuti.

Text

Performance in elections

References

Living people
1956 births
Communist Party of Brazil politicians
Democratic Labour Party (Brazil) politicians
Free Fatherland Party (Brazil) politicians
Workers' General Party politicians
Members of the Legislative Assembly of Rio Grande do Sul
Brazilian people of Azorean descent
Brazilian people of Flemish descent
Children of presidents of Brazil
Candidates for President of Brazil